Nennig is a village in the Saarland, Germany, part of the municipality of Perl. It is situated on the river Moselle, opposite Remich, Luxembourg.

Overview
Nennig is known for a Roman villa containing well-preserved mosaics that were excavated in the 19th century. The village was a condominium of the Trier bishopric, Lorraine (the Kingdom of France from 1766) and Luxembourg until its annexation by Revolutionary France in 1794. During the Second World War Nennig was almost completely destroyed as the village changed hands several times in late-1944 and early-1945.

Photogallery

See also
Borg, Saarland

External links

 Nennig official website

Villages in Saarland
Former municipalities in Saarland